Katy Deepwell is a feminist art critic and academic, based in London. She is the founder and editor of n.paradoxa: international feminist art journal, published 1998-2017, in 40 volumes by KT press. She founded KT press as a feminist not-for-profit publishing company to publish the journal and books on feminist art. KT press has published 8 e-books, supported by the Andy Warhol Foundation for the Visual Arts. In Feb 2017, Katy Deepwell wrote and published a MOOC (a mass open online course) on feminism and contemporary art at. In May 2020, a second advanced course on feminist art manifestos was added to the site. The model for both MOOCs is FemTechNet’s DOCC: Distributed Open Collaborative Course.

The journal was part of the Documenta 12 Magazines Project in 2007. n.paradoxa is an art magazine which publishes articles on women artists from around the world. The journal released all articles as open access PDFs in 2018, and continued to produce The Feminist Art Observatory, listing information about contemporary women artists and feminism.

She was President of the British Section of AICA (International Association of Art Critics), 1997–2000. She was Chair of Trustees of Women's Art Library, London, 1989–1994, a national charity and library on women artists which closed in 2002, now housed at Goldsmiths, University of London.

Her work has been centred on the promotion of feminism in relation to the contemporary art and art criticism.

Early life and education
Deepwell trained as an artist at St Martins School of Art, 1982–1985. She then obtained a M.A Social History of Art from University of Leeds in 1986 and a PhD from Birkbeck College, University of London in 1991.

Works

Academic work
Deepwell is currently Professor of Contemporary Art, Theory and Criticism at Middlesex University. Katy Deepwell has taught since 1986 in different Universities in UK and Europe. Her last post was as Reader in Contemporary Art, Theory and Criticism and Head of Research Training at University of the Arts London (2004–2010).

She has worked as a lecturer teaching art history and art theory in universities including Goldsmiths' College, Oxford Brookes University, Kent Institute of Art and Design and University of Copenhagen since 1986. She was a Leverhulme Research Fellow (Leverhulme Trust) in 2008–2009. In 2021, she was awarded a Distinguished Feminist Scholar award as an art critic by College Art Association in USA.

Publications and editorial works
 3  Sole Authored:
 Women Artists Between the Wars: ‘A Fair Field and No Favour’ (Manchester University Press, 2010) .
 Dialogues: Women Artists from Ireland. (London: IB Tauris, 2005). 
 Ten Decades: The Careers of Ten Women Artists born 1897-1906,  Exhibition Catalogue of Arts Council Touring Exhibition, Norwich Gallery, NIAD, 
April 1992, 
 
 7 Edited volumes:
 Feminist Art Activisms and Artivisms (Netherlands: Valiz, published March 2020)  
 All-Women Art Spaces in Europe in the Long 1970s (co-edited with Agata Jakubowska) (Liverpool University Press, 2018) 
 Feminist Art Manifestos: An Anthology (KT press, ebook, 2014)  https://www.amazon.com/dp/B00PBBVLQU
 The Gender, Theory and Art Anthology: 1970-2000 [English title of Russian book] (co-edited with Mila Bredikhina) (Moscow: Rosspen Publishing House, 2005) 
 Women Artists and Modernism (Manchester University Press, 1998).  .
 Art Criticism and Africa(Saffron Books, July 1997)  
 New Feminist Art Criticism: Critical Strategies (Manchester University Press, 1995)  – also translated to Spanish: Nueva Critica Feminista de Arte (Universidad de Valencia, 1998).

Recent essays
 ‘Art Criticism and the State of Feminist Art Criticism’ Arts (MDPI journal) Special Issue on ‘State of Art Criticism’, Feb 2020.
 ‘Why 1989? Writing about feminism, art and “the global contemporary”’ in Elvan Zabunyan et al, Constellations Subjectivités. Pour une Histoire Féministes de L'Art (France: éditions iXe, 2020) 
 ‘Postdigital Education, Feminism, Women’ Postdigital Education (Springer) (Jan 2020) 
 ‘Art Criticism and Africa: AICA Conference at the Courtauld Institute, London, 1996’ in Jean-Marc Poinsot and Henry Meyric Hughes (eds) A Celebration of AICA’s 70th Anniversary / Une Célébration du 70ème anniversaire de l’AICA: 1949-50 – 2019-20. The Histories of AICA, continued (online publication on AICA International website, 25 September 2019.
 ‘n.paradoxa’s MOOC (mass open online course): A case study in feminist online pedagogies’ for Gail Crimmins (ed) Strategies for Resisting Sexism in the Academy : Higher Education, Gender and Neoliberalism (Series: Palgrave Studies in Gender and Education, 2019) 
 Interview with Silvia Ziranek: ‘I enjoy appearance, colour, shape and form – and I love dressing up’ Studio International online, September 2019.

 ‘On feminist art manifestos’ Cambridge Literary Review, no. 11 (2018) pp.121-132
 ‘Feminist contributions to artworks in Slide-Tape’ in Mo White (ed) Slide-Tape (UK: Vivid Projects, 2018)  
 ‘Feminist Critique: Open and Critical Enquiry: A Conversation between Katy Deepwell and Suzana Milevska’ in Spaces for Criticism (eds. Pascal Gielen, Thijs Lijster, Suzana Milevska, Ruth Sonderegger) (Amsterdam: Valiz publishers, 2015)  pp.171-192.
 ‘Women Artists in/out of Vorticism’ in G. Berghaus (ed) International Yearbook of Futurism Studies (2015)  pp. 21-43
 ‘We don’t need another heroine: Sanja Ivekovic’s Counter-Narratives’ in Helena Reckitt (ed) Sanja Ivekovic: Unknown Heroine - A Reader (London: Calvert 22 Foundation, 2013)  pp.110-133
 ‘Beatrice Cussol: Feminist, not feminine’ in Mia Sundberg (ed) Beatrice Cussol: Rude Girls (Stockholm: Art and Theory/Sprit Museum, 2013)  pp. 35–45
 'Questioning the gender order: feminist interventions in aesthetics and cultural politics' Artistic Production and the Feminist Theory of Art: New Debates 3 (Vitoria-Gasteiz: Centro Cultural Montehermoso, 2011) Basque, pp. 30–42; Spanish pp. 150–164; English, pp. 270–282.
  'Claims for a Feminist Politics in Painting' in Anne Ring Petersen (et al., eds.) Contemporary Painting in Context (University of Copenhagen, Novo Nordisk Foundation, 2009)  pp. 139–160
  'Cooling out on Post-Feminism' in Sabine Schaschl, Bettina Steinbrugge, and Rene Zechlin (eds) Cooling Out: On the Paradox of Feminism (Zurich: JRP Ringier, 2008) (English, pp. 74–83, German pp. 248–257)
  Mehr also sieben dringender Fragen zum Feminismusí in Gisela Weimann (ed.) Geteilte Zeit: Fragen und Antworten (Weimar, Edition Eselsweg, 2008). Text in German and English. pp. 237–243
 Republished as More than seven urgent questions for feminism online in English in n.paradoxa issue 20 online, April 2008
  'Women War Artists in the First World War in Britain' in Karen Brown (ed) Agency and Mediation amongst Women Artists between the Wars (Ashgate Press, 2008) pp. 11–36
 'Feminist Models: Now and in the Future' in It's Time for Action (There's No Option) About Feminism Migros Museum (Zurich/ JRP Ringier Kunstverlag, 2007) German pp. 43–63, English pp. 190–208
 'Issues in Feminist Curation: Strategies and Practices' in Janet Marstine (ed) An Introduction to New Museum Theory (USA: Blackwells, 2006)  pp. 64–84
 'DÈfier l'indiffÈrence a la diffÈrence: les paradoxes de la critique d'art fÈministe' in Pierre-Henry Frangne & Jean-Marc Poinsot (eds) L'Invention de Critique D'Art (France: Presses Universitaires de Rennes, 2002, text in French)  pp. 191–205
 'Women, Representation and Speculations on the End of History Painting' for N.Green and P.Seddon (ed) History Painting Reassessed (Manchester University Press, October 2000)  pp. 131–148
 'Text and Subtexts' in Binghui Huangfu (ed) Text and Subtext: Contemporary Art and Asian Women Earl-Lu Gallery, Lasalle-SIA College of Arts, Singapore. Book for International Touring Exhibition of Contemporary Asian Women Artists. Curator: Binghui Huangfu. (June 2000)   pp. 33–41
 'Curating Feminist Histories' in Power Ekroth, Tove Helander (eds) Expositioner: Antologi On Utstallningsmediet: The Exhibition as an Artistic Medium  Stockholm: Konstfack, 2000 published for the Sollentuna Art Fair, Stockholm. (March 2000)  pp. 88–96

References

 Katy Deepwell Women Artists between the Wars
 Katy Deepwell's curated selection on Axis 'Feminist Art practices: rewind, remix and pump up the volume!'
 Twelve Step guide to feminist art, art history and criticism
 Katy Deepwell and Judy Freya Sibayan in conversation Regendering Documenta at Documenta 12 (Kassel, 2007) as part of the Documenta 12 Magazines Project, published in CtrlP

External links
 KT press n.paradoxa: international feminist art journal n.paradoxa
 n.paradoxa's MOOCs n.paradoxa
 Katy Deepwell at Amazon.com

Living people
English feminists
English art critics
Academics of Middlesex University
Alumni of the University of Leeds
Alumni of Birkbeck, University of London
Writers from London
Year of birth missing (living people)